Charles Hopkins-Thyme (born 1936 in London) is a British author and career coach for celebrities.

He styles himself “Success Counselor” and according to media articles he has worked with among others Jennifer Lopez. He has sparked controversy several times, particularly with his pro-Hollywood attitude, often claiming that fame outside Hollywood "isn’t really fame at all".
He has toured internationally several times, the two latest tours in 2007 and 2013 has included lectures in London, New York City, Berlin, Stockholm and Kuala Lumpur.

References

1936 births
Living people